Īve parish is an administrative unit of Talsi Municipality, Latvia. The parish center is located in Tiņģere.

Towns, villages and settlements of Īve parish 
 Dūmciems
 Grodnieki
 Īve
 Kalnmuiža
 Ķurbe
 Ozolmuiža
 Silmuiža
 Silciems
 Tiņģere

See also 
 Tiņģere Manor

References 

Parishes of Latvia
Talsi Municipality